Marie-Laure Dougnac (born 1 February 1962) is a French actress specializing in the dubbing of English films and TV shows into French.

Theatre
 2000 : La main passe by Georges Feydeau, produced by Gildas Bourdet, Théâtre national de Chaillot, Théâtre Comédia

Dubbing

Films
 Joey Lauren Adams : Layla Moloney in Big Daddy
 Heather Graham : Alice Loudon in Killing Me Softly (in France, Feu de glace)
 Renee O'Connor : Dr. Jessica Ryan in Boogeyman 2
 Parker Posey : Danica Talos in Blade: Trinity
 KaDee Strickland : Susan Williams in The Grudge
 Liv Tyler :
 Arwen in The Lord of the Rings
 Betty Ross in The Incredible Hulk
 Naomi Watts : Eleonor Whitman in The International (in France, L'Enquête)
 Renée Zellweger : Dorothy Boyd in Jerry Maguire
 Catherine Zeta-Jones : Virginia Baker in Entrapment (in France, Haute Voltige)

Television series
 Laura Allen :
 Lilly Moore-Tyler in The 4400
 Julia Mallory in Dirt
 Sasha Alexander : Jessie Presser in Wasteland
 Kelly Collins Lintz : Tracy Connelly in Surface
 Kellie Martin : Lucy Knight in ER
 Renee O'Connor : Gabrielle in Xena: Warrior Princess
 Kelly Rowan : Kirsten Cohen in The O.C. (in France, Newport Beach)
 Marie-Laure Dougnac : Carole in Mr. Baby
 Ally Walker : Samantha "Sam" Waters in Profiler

Acting career
Dougnac had a cameo in the short film Foutaises and she also portrayed Julie Clapet, the butcher's daughter in the Jean-Pierre Jeunet film Delicatessen.  She also appeared in the film 2001 Amélie.

References

External links
 Official Website of Marie-Laure Dougnac 
 

1962 births
Living people
Actresses from Lyon
French television actresses
French film actresses
French voice actresses
20th-century French actresses
21st-century French actresses
French women novelists